Aegilops longissima (syn. Aegilops sharonense Eig, Sitopsis longissima (Schweinf. & Muschl.) Á. Löve, Triticum longissimum (Schweinf. & Muschl.) Bowden, Triticum sharonense L.) is a species in the family Poaceae. It is native to Palestine and the Levant.

External links
Aegilops longissima
GrainGenes Species Report: Aegilops longissima 
USDA Plants Profile: Aegilops longissima

longissima
Flora of Israel
Flora of Western Asia
Flora of Palestine (region)